Lachabad (also Romanized as Lāchābād) is a village in Golashkerd Rural District, in the Central District of Faryab County, Kerman Province, Iran. At the 2006 census, its population was 70, in 16 families.

References 

Populated places in Faryab County